Columbus Square consists of five luxury rental buildings located in the Upper West Side of Manhattan, in New York City. Initially known as Columbus Village, the five buildings include: 808 Columbus Avenue on the west side of Columbus Avenue between 97th and 100th Streets; 775 Columbus Avenue at the northeast corner of 97th Street and Columbus Avenue; 795 Columbus Avenue on the east side of Columbus Avenue between 98th and 99th Streets, 805 Columbus Avenue on the southeast corner of 100th Street and Columbus Avenue, and 801 Amsterdam Avenue on the southeast corner of 100th Street and Amsterdam Avenue. In 2009, according to the New York Daily News, Columbus Square was the largest residential development currently being built in Manhattan.

Retail space
The retail space is being leased by Winnick Realty. The  Whole Foods Market, which anchors the 808 Columbus Avenue building, opened in August 2009. TJ Maxx, Michael's, Sephora, and Modell's have also opened, and Petco have confirmed their lease. Other rumored tenants include Crumbs Bakery, Associated Supermarket, Chase Bank, and Borders Books. A community health center, the Ryan Center, will have space in the complex as will the Mandell School and the Solomon Schechter School of Manhattan.

Structural design
The 808 tower on Columbus Avenue was designed by Costas Kondylis and Partners, LLP. Design features include valet parking, a lobby, a residents’ lounge with a fireplace, a catering kitchen, a fitness center, a children's playroom, a bicycle storage room and a media center. Interior designs were by Andrés Escobar, featuring floor-to-ceiling windows, soundproof oak floors, washer-dryers, stainless-steel appliances and CaesarStone countertop.

In May 2009, the 29-story tower located on 808 Columbus Avenue became available with 359 residential units. The remaining buildings were scheduled to be completed by October 2010.

References

External links

Buildings and structures in Manhattan
Upper West Side